Blagoj Istatov (5 April 1947 – 27 September 2018) was a Macedonian football goalkeeper and coach.

Club career
During his career, he played for FK Belasica, FK Pobeda, Belgrade's FK Partizan, winning with them the 1975–76 Yugoslav First League, and with Dutch FC Utrecht. He made his Eredivisie debut for Utrecht in August 1976 against Feyenoord. He went on to play over 60 games in two seasons for them.

His name was often misspelled as Blagoje (the Serbian language variant) or by the more traditional Macedonian language variant of Blagoja.

References

External links
 Duch League stats at ElfVoetbal
 Stats from Partizan at Partizan official website

1947 births
2018 deaths
Sportspeople from Strumica
Association football goalkeepers
Yugoslav footballers
Macedonian footballers
FK Belasica players
FK Pobeda players
FK Partizan players
FC Utrecht players
Yugoslav Second League players
Yugoslav First League players
Eredivisie players
Yugoslav expatriate footballers
Expatriate footballers in the Netherlands
Yugoslav expatriate sportspeople in the Netherlands
Macedonian football managers
FK Belasica managers
FK Skopje managers
Macedonian expatriate football managers
Macedonian expatriate sportspeople in Greece